The first successful attempts to summit Mount Everest by Indians were in 1960. The first Indians to reach the summit were a group led by Captain M.S. Kohli in 1965. 422 Indians made a total of 465 attempts between 1965 and 2018. These include 43 repeat attempts by 29 summiteers. There have been 81 attempts by 74 women and 7 repeat attempts by 4 female summiteers from India. Kasturi Savekar from Kolhapur, India climbed Mount Everest on 14 May 2022.

Notable ascents

List by decade 
A decade-by-decade breakup of Indian summiteers of Mount Everest.

1960 to 1999

1960 
The first Indian expedition to scale Everest was in 1960 by Indian Army led by Brigadier Gyan Singh and this was unsuccessful. Climbers Colonel Narendra Kumar, Sonam Gyatso, and Sherpa Nawang Gombu reached up to  but due to extremely bad weather they had to turn back.

1962 
The second Indian expedition to scale Everest was in 1962 by Indian Army led by Major John Dias and this was also unsuccessful. Climbers Captain M S Kohli, Sonam Gyatso, and Hari Dang reached up to  but due to extremely bad weather they also had to turn back.

1965 
In 1965, the third Indian expedition by the Indian Army, which was led by Captain M S Kohli, included 21 core members of the expedition and 50 climbing sherpas. The initial attempt was during late April and due to bad weather, they came back to base camp and waited 2 weeks for better weather. By the end of May, they succeeded by scaling the mountain in four successive attempts. Colonel Narendra "Bull" Kumar was the deputy leader of the team. India became the fourth country to scale Mount Everest.

It was on 20 May 1965 that Lt Col Avatar. S. Cheema, Gurdial Singh, and Nawang Gombu Sherpa climbed the peak and became the first Indian to achieve this feat. This was the second time that Nawang Gombu Sherpa climbed Mount Everest. The first was with American Expedition in 1963. Tenzing Norgay, the first man to climb Mount Everest, was his uncle.
Two days later on 22 May,  Sonam Gyatso and Sonam Wangyal reached the summit and became the first siblings to have climbed Mount Everest together.
On 24 May, C. P. Vohra and Ang Kami Sherpa reached the top of Mount Everest.
On 29 May, the fourth and last summit was with Major H. P. S. Ahluwalia, H. C. S. Rawat, and Phu Dorjee Sherpa. This was the first time three climbers stood on the summit together.

Records of the expedition

 First Indian team to successfully climb Everest.
 First Indian leader to successfully lead the Everest expedition by Captain M S Kohli.
 First time three climbers stood on the summit together.
 First time nine climbers reached the summit, setting a world record, which India held for 17 years
 First man in the world to climb Everest twice - Nawang Gombu
 First time that siblings climbed Everest together.
 First Nepalese to climb Everest – Phu Dorjee Sherpa

South Col side summiteers

 Avtar Singh Cheema 
 Nawang Gombu Sherpa
 Sonam Gyatso
 Sonam Wangyal
 C. P. Vohra
 Ang Kami Sherpa
 H. P. S. Ahluwalia
 H. C. S. Rawat
 Phu Dorjee Sherpa
 Gurdial Singh

1966 to 1983 
There were no ascents for 17 years, between 1966 and 1983.

1984
In 1984, the fourth Indian expedition was led by Darshan Kumar Khullar and recorded a total of 5 ascents, including that of Bachendri Pal, the first woman summiteer from India - all from the South side (Nepal). Lieutenant Colonel Prem Chand was the deputy leader.

On 23 May 1984, Bachendri Pal achieves history as the first Indian woman to conquer Everest.

South Col side summiteers

Phu Dorjee Sherpa - first Indian to summit without oxygen
Bachendri Pal
 Dorjee Lhatoo Sherpa
 Sonam Palzor Sherpa
 Ang Dorje Sherpa

1985 to 1991 
There were no ascents for 6 years, between 1985 and 1991.

1992
The 1992 Indo-Tibetan Border Police Expedition to Mount Everest by Indo-Tibetan Border Police was led by additional deputy superintendent Major Hukam Singh and recorded a total of 8 ascents by Indians including that of Santosh Yadav. Senior medical officer Chittaranjan R. Pattanayak was the deputy leader.

South Col side summiteers

 Sunil Dutta Sharma
 Prem Singh
 Kanhaya Lal Pokhriyal
 Mohan Singh Gunjyal
 Santosh Yadav
 Lobsang (Deepak) Sherpa Tsering
 Sange Muktuk Sherpa 
 Wangchuk Sherpa

1993
The 1993 Indo-Nepalese Everest expedition was the first all-woman expedition launched by Indian Mountaineering Foundation and funded by the Ministry of Youth Affairs and Sports. The 21-member team was led by Bachendri Pal. The historic expedition set up several world records at the time which included the largest number of persons (18) of a single expedition to climb Mount Everest, largest number of women (7) from a single country to climb Mount Everest.

Santosh Yadav became the first woman in the world to climb Mount Everest twice while Dicky Dolma became the youngest woman (19 years old) in the world to climb the highest peak in the world. Santosh Yadav and Rita Gombu Marwah were the deputy leaders. A total of 18 ascents happened - 11 of them were Indians and 7 were women.

South Col side summiteers

 Santosh Yadav 
 Dicky Dolma
 Kunga Bhutia
 Dal Dev (Baldev) Kunwar
 Nima Norbu Dolma
 Suman Kutiyal
 Savita Martolia
 Deepu Sharma
 Rajiv Sharma
 Radha Devi Thakur 
 Kusang Dorje Sherpa 
 Lopsang Jangbu Sherpa
 Dorje Sherpa
 Ngatemba Sherpa 
 Ngatemba Sherpa
 Nima Dorje I Sherpa 
 Ongada Chiring Sherpa 
 Tenzing Sherpa

Lobsang Tshering Bhotia, the nephew of Tenzing Norgay, participated as a member of the 1993 Australian Macedonian Everest Expedition led by Tashi Wangchuk Tenzing. He reached the top but died by falling at the time of descending.

1994 to 1995
No ascents were made by Indians in the years 1994 and 1995.

1996
The second 1996 Indo-Tibetan Border Police expedition to Mount Everest by the Indo-Tibetan Border Police was led by Mohinder Singh to reach the summit on the backdrop of the 1996 Mount Everest disaster, and resulted in three summiteers of the expedition dying. The expedition is credited as being the first Indian ascent of Everest from the North Side and a total of 8 persons reaching the summit. Indo-Tibetan Border Police personnel, Parash Mani Das and Harbhajan Singh were the deputy leaders.

North Col side summiteers

 Tsewang Paljor
 Dorje Morup
 Tsewang Samanla
 Tashi Ram Negi
 Hira Ram Singh 
 Kusang Dorjee Sherpa 
 Nadre Sherpa 
 Sange Muktuk Sherpa

1997 
No ascents were made by Indians in 1997.

1998 
In 1998, an expedition to Mount Everest was led by Hrishikesh Yadav as part of the Indian Independence Golden Jubilee celebration. During this expedition, a total of 8 persons reached the summit - 2 of them were Indians and 6 sherpas. This was the first successful Indian civilian expedition over any 8000m peak.

North Col side summiteers

 Surendra Chavan
Love Raj Singh Dharmshaktu
 Dawa Tashi Sherpa
 Dawa Norbu II Sherpa
 Tamtin Sherpa
 Nawang Tenzing Sherpa I
 Phinzo Norbu Sherpa
 Niam Gyalzen Sherpa

Another Indian, Kusang Dorjee Sherpa, reached the top as a hired member of the Himalayan Kingdom expedition led by David Walsh.

1999 
The 1999 Indian Everest Millennium Expedition was led by Santosh Yadav. During this expedition, a total of 4 ascents were by Indians.

South Col side summiteers

 Amar Prakash Dogra 
 Kusang Dorjee Sherpa
 Sange Muktuk Sherpa
 Dinesh Kumar

2000 - 2009 
No ascents were made by Indians in 2000.

2001
The 2001 Indian Army Mount Everest Expedition was led by Colonel Krishan Kumar. During this expedition, 15 people reached the summit - 7 of them were Indians and 8 were sherpas. Satish Chander Sharma was the deputy leader.

South Col side summiteers

 Chanchal Singh Dhasila
 Neel Chand Dogra
 Mohinder Singh Negi
 Palden Giachho Negi
 Amar Prakash Dogra 
Saurabh Singh Shekhawat
 Chhering Norbu Bodh
 Til Bikram Budhathoki
 Dendi Sherpa
 Lhakpa Nuru Sherpa
 Mingma Tshering Sherpa
 Nga Temba Sherpa
 Pasang Gelu Sherpa
 Pasang Rinji Sherpa
 Pasang Tendi Sherpa

2002 
No ascents were made by Indians in 2002.

2003
The 2003 Indo-Nepal Army on Everest and Lhotse Expedition, led by Colonel Ashok Abbey, recorded a total of 16 persons reaching the summit - 9 of them were Indians and 7 were sherpas. Major Chandra Shekhar Manda was the deputy leader.

South Col side summiteers

 Angchuk Chhering
 Tashi Gyapo
 Rajendra Singh Jalal 
 Jagat Singh Negi 
 Lalit Kumar Negi
 Kunwar Singh Rawat
Saurabh Singh Shekhawat 
 Abhijeet Singh
 Lal Singh Thapa
 Damai Chhiri Sherpa
 Dendi Sherpa
 Pasang Sherpa
 Pasang Rinji Sherpa
 Pasang Rita Sherpa
 Pemba Rinzi/Rinji Sherpa
 Pemba Tshering (Pemba Chhiri) Sherpa

Also, the 2003 Himalayan Mountaineering Institute Everest Expedition led by the principal of Himalayan Mountaineering Institute Colonel, Vijay Singh Thakur, recorded a total of 2 ascents by Indians. Kulwant Singh Dhami was the deputy leader.

North Col side summiteers

 Kusang Dorjee Sherpa 
 Nadre Sherpa

2004
The first 2004 Indian Navy Mount Everest North Face Expedition by Indian Navy led by Satyabrata Dam recorded a total of 12 persons reaching the summit - 5 of them were Indians and 7 sherpas. Lieutenant Amit Pande was the deputy leader.

North Col side summiteers

 Satyabrata Dam 
 Dr Viking Bhanoo
 Abhishek Kankan
 Rakesh Kumar Lagwal
 Vikas Kumar Mehra

2005
The 2005 Indian Army Women Everest Expedition, led by Major Saurabh Singh Shekhawat, recorded a total of 15 persons to reach the summit - 9 of them were Indians and 6 were sherpas. The deputy leader was lieutenant colonel Anand Swaroop.

North Col side summiteers

Saurabh Singh Shekhawat 
 Topgay Bhutia
 Tsering Ladol
 Dachen Lhamo
Sipra Majumdar
 Jagat Singh Negi 
 Ashwini Ajitshing Sadekar Pawar
 Kaman Singh
 Surjeet Singh

The 2005 Indian Air Force Everest Expedition by Indian Air Force led by Air Force wing commander Amit Chowdhury recorded a total of 7 persons reach the summit - 3 of them were Indians and 4 were sherpas.

North Col side summiteers

 Sirigereshiva Shankarappa Chaitanya
 Niku Ram Chowdhary
 Ramesh Chandra Tripathi

2006

The First Border Security Force (BSF) Everest Expedition 2006, led by Major Sharab Chandub Negi, recorded a total of 16 persons reaching the summit - 7 of them were Indians and 9 were sherpas,.

South Col side summiteers

 Sharab Chandub Negi
Loveraj Singh Dharmshaktu 
 Kamlash Kumar Bounthiyal
 Manoj Dahal
 Kedar Singh Koranga
 Parveen Singh Lohia
 Bhagat Singh Rawat
Mastan Babu Malli (expedition led by Arnold Coster)

The third 2006 Indo-Tibetan Border Police expedition to Mount Everest, led by Harbhajan Singh, recorded a total of 14 persons reaching the summit -12 of them were Indians and 2 were sherpas. Prem Singh was the deputy leader.

North Col side summiteers

 Prem Singh 
 Nawang Dorjey
 Mohammad Ali Khan
 Sri Kishan 
 Pradeep Kumar
 Vishal Mani Maithani
 Hira Ram Singh 
 Pasang Tenzing Sherpa 
 Wangchuk Sherpa 
 Jot (Jyoti) Singh Bhandari
 Ongda Gyalzen Sherpa 
 Sangay Furi Sherpa

2007 
The 2007 Indian Army Everest Expedition led by Lt. Colonel Ishwar Singh Thapa recorded a total of 24 persons reaching the summit - 12 of them was Indians and 12 were sherpas.

North Col side summiteers

 Tsering Angchok
 Amar Dev Bhatt
 Maruti Khandagle
 Sachin Raosaheb Patil
 Dharmjot Singh
 Balwant Singh Negi
 Khem Chand Thakur
 Narendra Singh Chandel
 Dayanand Dhali
 Nandkumar Jagtap
 Ram Bahadur Mall
 Tejpal Singh Negi

13. Shekhar Babu Bachinepally reached the summit in a separate two-men expedition.

South Col side summiteers

Ongda Gyalzen Sherpa reached the summit as a Sherpa in the Caudweel Xtreem Everest led by Michael Patrick William (Mike) Grocott.

2008
The 2008 Indian Army Snow Lion Everest Expedition, led by Army officer Ashok Abbey, recorded a total of 18 persons reaching the summit - 9 of them were Indians and 9 were sherpas.

South Col side summiteers

 Sonam Gurmey
 Pasang Tenzin Lektso
 Dechen Lhamo
 Thupten Lobsang 
 Jigmey Namgyal
 Tashi Phuntsok
 Tenzin Rigden
 Kumchok Tenpa 
 Champa Younten

The 2008 Gyamtsho Tshering Bhutia Everest Expedition recorded a total of 22 persons reaching the summit - 10 of them were Indians and 12 were Sherpa.

South Col side summiteers

 Dawa Dhendup Bhutia
 Kunzang Gyatso Bhutia
 Atul Karwal
 Yaduram Sharma
 Nima Wangchuk Sherpa
 Yangdi Sherpa
 Ashish Kumar Singh
 N. Suraj Singh
 Ram Singh
 Phul Maya Tamang

With he help of 3 sherpas, Kalpana Dash, an Indian lawyer and mountaineer, reached the top. She had attempted to climb Mount Everest twice before, once in 2004 and once in 2006, but failed due to bad weather and health conditions.

2009
The 2009 Nehru Institute of Mountaineering Everest Expedition, led by Brig. Mangal Murti Masur, VSM, recorded a total of 17 persons reaching the summit - 10 of them were Indians and 7 were sherpas.

South Col side summiteers

 Pratap Singh Bisht
 Kavita Burathoki
Loveraj Singh Dharmshaktu 
 Vinod Gusain
 Satal Singh Panwar
 Khushal Singh Rana
 Dashrath Singh Rawat
 Dinesh Singh Rawat
 Vishveshvar Semwal
 Surendra Singh Bodh

On 21 May 2009, Krushnaa Patil climbs the summit and became the youngest woman (16 years and 7 months years old) in the world to climb the highest peak in the world. Gaurav Sharma and Tapi Mra also reached the summit as part of two separate expeditions.

2010 - 2019

2010 
2010 recorded a total of 4 ascents by Indians through separate excursions - all from the South side (Nepal).

On 22 May 2010, Arjun Vajpai became the youngest Indian to reach the summit at the age of 16 years, 11 months, and 18 days.

South Col side summiteers
 Basanta Kumar Singha Roy
 Debasish Biswas
 Arjun Vajpai 
 Mamta Sodha

2011
2011 recorded a total of 20 ascents by 19 Indians (double ascent Anshu Jamsenpa) from the South side (Nepal).

Premlata Agarwal became the oldest Indian woman to have scaled Mount Everest at the age of 48. Anshu Jamsenpa summited twice on 12 May and 21 May.

South Col side summiteers
Tine Mena (first woman from Arunachal Pradesh)
 Jogabyasa Bhoi
Ganesh Chandra Jena
 Dipankar Ghosh
 Rajib Bhattacharya
 Sunita Singh Choken
Premlata Agarwal (became the oldest Indian woman to have scaled Mount Everest)
 Sushma Kaushik
 Vikas Kaushik
 Narinder Singh
 Pawan Grewal
2011 Indian Air Force Women Everest Expedition

The 2011 Indian Air Force Women Everest Expedition led by Lt. Colonel Narender Kumar Dahiya recorded a total of 19 persons reaching the summit, 7 of them were Indians and 12 sherpas.

South Col side summiteers
 Nivedita Chaudhary
 Devidutta Panda
 Nirupama Pandey 
 Ganesh Singh Pokhariya
 Rajika Sharma
 Raju Sindhu
 Jasbir Singh

2012
2012 recorded a total of 52 ascents by Indians, 10 of them was women - 7 from the North side (China/ Tibet) and 45 from South side (Nepal).

2012 Indo-Tibetan Border Police expedition to Mount Everest
The fourth 2012 Indo-Tibetan Border Police expedition to Mount Everest led by Prem Singh recorded a total of eight persons reach on the summit, seven of them were Indian and one was a sherpa.

North Col side summiteers
 Krishna Prasad Gurung
 Pradeep Kumar Negi
 Pasang Tenzing Sherpa (2nd time of 2)
 Devendra Singh
 Virender Singh
 Ratan Singh Sonal
 Mingma Dorchi Sherpa

2012 Indian Army Women Everest Expedition
The 2012 Indian Army Women Everest Expedition led by Lt. Colonel Ajay Kothiyal recorded a total of 28 persons reach on the summit, 15 of them was Indians and 13 sherpas,

South Col side summiteers
 Neha Bhatnagar
 Prabhu Dayal Bisht
 Prachi Ramesh Gole
 Rajendra Singh Jalal (2nd time of 3)
 Ranveer Singh Jamwal(1st time of 3)
 Gary Jarman Lamare
 Smitha Laxman (first woman from Karnataka)
 Neikhrietuonuo Linyu
 Sherab Palden
  Deepika Rathore (first time of 2)
 Namrata Rathore
 Poonam Sangwan
 Sudhir Singh (first time of 2)
 Tejpal Singh Negi (2nd time of 2)
 Praveen Thapa

2012 Indian Army Snow lion Everest Expedition 
The 2012 Indian Army Snow lion Everest Expedition led by Lt. Colonel Bhupesh Hada recorded a total of 11 persons reach on the summit, seven of them were Indian  and four were sherpas.

South Col side summiteers
 Bhupesh Hada
 Chokyi
 Chomphel
 Thupten Lobsang (2nd time of 2)
 (first Indian army to scale mounteverest summit without supplementary oxygen on 5 May 2012) 
 Tenpa Tashi
 Thakpa Tenzing 
 Tamding Tsewang

2012 Himalayan Mountaineering Institute Everest Expedition 
The 2012 Himalayan Mountaineering Institute Everest Expedition by Himalayan Mountaineering Institute on 2012 led by Lt. Colonel Neeraj Rana recorded a total of 10 persons reach on the summit, 6 of them was Indians and 4 sherpas.

South Col side summiteers
 Ngodup Bhutia
 Kamal Nayan
 Yamuna Prasad Paneru
 Pawel Sharma
 Phuchung Sherpa
 Mahavir Singh

Other summiteers of 2012
 Kazi Sherpa (first time of 2)
 Shrihari Ashok Tapkir
 Sagar Sanjay Palkar
 Anand Ashok Bansode 
 Toolika Rani
 Ashish Sharad Mane
 Prasad Narendra Joshi
 Krishna Sukhadev Dhokale
 Chetan Shirish Ketkar
 Rupesh Bharat Khopade
 Surendra Ravindra Jalihal
 Rahul Balu Yelange
 Kapil Ruhil Singh
 Loveraj Singh Dharmshaktu (4th time of 7)
 Rajendra Singh Pal
 Meghlal Mahato
 Binita Soren

2013
2013 recorded a total of 67 ascents by Indians. 11 of them were women - all from the South side (Nepal).

Ravindra Kumar, the only IAS officer to have climbed the Everest, a native of begusarai
On 19 May 2013, Ravindra Kumar became the first Indian Administrative Officer to climb the Mt. Everest.
On 23 May 2019, Kumar became the first Indian Administrative Officer to climb the Mt. Everest twice.

 Ravindra Kumar

Arunima Sinha - first female amputee
On 21 May 2013, Arunima Sinha became the first female amputee to scale Mount Everest.

 Arunima Sinha

Tashi and Nungshi Malik - first siblings and first twins
Nungshi Malik and Tashi Malik, the first twins to climb Mount Everest together, summited.

 Nungshi Malik
 Tashi Malik

2013 Indo Nepal Joint Army Everest Expedition
The 2013 Indo Nepal Joint Army Everest Expedition led by Colonel Ranveer Singh Jamwal recorded a total of 43 persons reach on the summit, 11 of them was Indians and 32 sherpas.

South Col side summiteers
 Ranveer Singh Jamwal (2nd time of 3)
 Unnikannan A. P. Veetil (first time of 2), first man from Kerala
 Mingmar Gurung
 Rajendra Singh Jalal (3rd time of 3)
 Manoj Joshi
 Hajari Lal (first time of 2)
 Chatter Singh
 Shivraj Singh
 Sudhir Singh (2nd time of 2)
 Sukhvir Singh
 Sonam Thinlas

2013 National Cadet Corp (NCC) Everest Expedition
The 2013 National Cadet Corps NCC Everest Expedition led by Satish Chander Sharma recorded a total of 25 persons reach on the summit, 11 of them was Indians and 14 sherpas.

South Col side summiteers
 Rajat Boktapa
 Raghuveer Chand
 Shankar Singh Chirom
 Ashwani Kumar
 Rafiq Ahmed Malik
 Jagat Singh Negi (3rd time of 3)
 Bidyachand Singh Phairembam
 Sandeep Rai
 Khimi Ram Thakur
 Arvind Raturi
 Karma Dawa Thakur

2013 Special Service Bureau (SSB) Everest Expedition
The 2013 Special Service Bureau (SSB) Everest Expedition by Sashastra Seema Bal led by Somit Joshi recorded a total of 11 persons reach on the summit, 5 of them was Indians and 6 sherpas,.

South Col side summiteers
 Somit Joshi
 Tame (Man) Bagang
 Subodh Kumar Chandola
 Vinod Singh Negi
 Rahul Kumar Tyagi

2013 North East India Everest Expedition
The 2013 North East India Everest Expedition led by Surjit Singh Leishangthem recorded a total of 21 persons reach on the summit, 11 of them was Indians and 10 sherpas.

South Col side summiteers
 Manish Kumar Deka
 Anand Gurung
 Anshu Jamsenpa (3rd time of 5)
 Nima Lama
 Chinekheinganba Nameirakpam
 Bidyapati Devi Ningthoutam
 Mohon Puyamcha
 Tarun Saikia
 Kazi Sherpa (2nd time of 2)
 Myrthong Wansuk (first woman from Meghalaya)
 David Zohmangaiha

2013 The Lawrence School, Sanawar Everest Expedition
The Lawrence School, Sanawar Everest Expedition led by Neeraj Rana recorded a total of 13 persons reach on the summit, 7 of them was Indians and 6 sherpas,

South Col side summiteers
 Fateh Singh Brar
 Prithvi Singh Chahal
 Raghav Joneja
 Shubham Kaushik
 Guribadat Singh Somal
 Ajay Sohal

Other summiteers of 2013

South Col side summiteers
 Bhushan Uday Harshe
 Anand Shivling Mali
 Ganesh Krishna More
 Ravindra Kumar Singh 
 Prem Kumar Singh
 Tusi Das
 Chhanda Gayen
 Ujjal Ray
 Debdas Nandy
 Anita Devi (first time of 2)
 Sushen Mahato
 Kanta Manu Devi
 Loveraj Singh Dharmshaktu (5th time of 7)
 Hemant Sachdev
 Ramlal Sharma
 Sanjay Kodain Sanzu
 Satyabrata Dam (2nd time of 2)
 Murad Lala

2014
2014 recorded a total of 5 ascents by Indians and one of them woman - all from the North side (China/ Tibet).

Malavath Poorna - youngest girl to conquer Mount Everest
The 2014 Transcend Adventures Everest Expedition led by Shekhar Babu Bachinepally created a new history, Malavath Poorna On 25 May 2014, at the age of 13 years and 11 months, became the youngest girl in the world to have reached the summit.

North Col side summiteers
 Malavath Poorna (Youngest girl in the world to climb Mount Everest )
 Sadhanapalli Anand Kumar
 Kishor Dattatraya Dhankude (first time of 2)
 Biplab Baidya
 Debabrata Mukherjee

2015
No ascents were made by Indians in 2015.

2016
2016 recorded a total of 50 ascents by Indians, 15 of them women. One died. Six were from the north side (China/ Tibet) and 44 from south side (Nepal).

2016 Transcend Adventures Everest Expedition 
The 2016 Transcend Adventures Everest Expedition led by Shekhar Babu Bachinepally recorded a total of 13 persons reach on the summit, 5 of them was Indians and 8 sherpas,.

North Col side summiteers
 Suhail Sharma
 Dhubi Bhadraiah
 S. Prabakaran
 Balan Shivaraman
 Gollapalli Ramamurthy Radhika
 Aparna Kumar

2016 Indian Army Everest Massif Expedition 
The 2016 Indian Army Everest Massif Expedition led by Colonel Ranveer Singh Jamwal recorded a total of 27 persons reach on the summit, 10 of them was Indians and 17 sherpas,.

South Col side summiteers
 Ranveer Singh Jamwal (3rd time of 3)
 K. Siva Kumar (first person from Tamil Nadu)
 Hajari Lal (2nd Time of 2)
 Ankur Rawat
 Unnikannan A. P. Veetil (2nd time of 2), first Keralite to climb Everest twice
 Mirza Zahid Baig
 Umesh Rai
 Pratap Singh
 Rinzin Dorje Bodh
 Dorjey Gyalson

2016 National Cadet Corp (NCC) Girls Everest Expedition
The 2016 National Cadet Corps (NCC) Girls Everest Expedition led by Guarav Karki recorded a total of 28 persons reach on the summit, 14 of them was Indians and 14 sherpas,

South Col side summiteers
 Guarav Karki
 Rigzen Dolker
 Lalrintluangi
 Tashi Laskit
 Pooja Mehra
 Deepika Rathore (2nd time of 2)
 Balkar Singh
 Sulaxchana Tamang
 Tsering Angmo
 Trishala Gurung
 Stanzin Laskit
 Vishal Ahlawat
 Dolyne Kharbhih
 Kumari Nutan

2016 Satori Adventurous International Everest Expedition 
2016 Satori Adventurous International Everest Expedition led by Jitesh Popatial Mody recorded a total of 16 persons reach on the summit, 6 of them was Indians and 10 sherpas.

South Col side summiteers
 Debraj Dutta
 Kuntal Ajit Joisher
 Bhagwan Singh Kushwah
 Chetna Sahoo
 Pradeep Chandra Sahoo
 Rafik Taher Shaikh

2016 Seven Summit Trecks Everest Expedition 
The 2016 Seven Summit Trecks Everest Expedition led by Iranian Azim Gheychisaz recorded a total of 25 persons reaching the summit, 7 of them Indians.

South Col side summiteers
 Naba Kumar Phukon
 Narender 
 Seema Rani 
 Rudra Prasad Halder
 Malay Mukherjee
 Ramesh Chandra Roy
 Satyarup Siddhanta (first from Karnataka)

Another summiteers in 2016

South Col side summiteers
 Nanda Dulal Das
 Henry David Teran
 Khorsing Terang
 Ankur Bahl
 Subhash Pal (died from exhaustion)
 Ratnesh Pandey
 Harshad Kamalaksha Rao

2017
2017 recorded a total of 49 ascents by 48 Indians (double ascent Anshu Jamsenpa), 7 accents by 6 women- One die - 18 from the North side (China/ Tibet) and 31 from South side (Nepal).

Anshu Jamsenpa - fastest double summit, most times (5) by Indian woman 
Anshu Jamsenpa created a new history. The first woman in the world to scale the summit of Mount Everest twice in a season (and the first to do so within 5 days). It is also the fastest double ascents of the tallest crest by a woman. This was her fifth summit and thus she became the most time climbed Indian woman.

South Col side summiteers
 Anshu Jamsenpa on 16 May 2017, 4th time of 5
 Anshu Jamsenpa on 21 May 2017, 5th time of 5

2017 Transcend Adventures Everest Expedition 
The 2017 Transcend Adventures Everest Expedition led by Shekhar Babu Bachinepally recorded a total of 37 persons reach on the summit, 16 of them was Indians and 21 sherpas.

North Col side summiteers
 Bharath Thammineni
 Suresh Babu Gullamarusu
 Nagaraju Sundarana
 Satya Rao Kare
 Krishna Rao Vooyaka
 Durga Rao Kunja
 Sagar Bodla
 Chenna Rao Gajavelli
 Dharma Teja Mothukuri
 Eswaraiah Seelam
 Hari Prasad Ganugapenta
 Sunda Raju Repalle
 Rani Boddu
 Asha Singh
 Sandhya Bai Vadithe
 Aparna Arvind Prabhudesai

North Col side summtiters

 Anita Devi (2nd time of 2) Become the first Indian woman to climb the peak from the both side, She climb the peak from South side in 2013.

2017 Indian Navy Everest-Lhotse Expedition
The 2017 Indian Navy Everest-Lhotse Expedition by Indian Navy led by Lieutenant Commander Sanjay K. Kulkarni recorded a total of 20 persons reach on the summit, 9 of them was Indians and 11 sherpas. Lieutenant Commander Vinit Doshi was the deputy leader.

South Col side summiteers
 Shashank Tewari
 Chandraveer Singh Yadav
 Anant Kukreti
 Bikas Maharana
 Avinash Kalyan Bawane, NM
 Hari Om
 Nagarajan Hari Prasath
 Ashish Gupta
 Sandeep Singh

2017 Indian Army Snow Lion Everest Expedition
The 2017 Indian Army Snow Lion Everest Expedition led by Vishal Dubey recorded a total of 13 persons reach on the summit, 7 of them was Indians and 6 sherpas.

South Col side summiteers
 Karma Zopa 
 Kalden Panjur 
 Sonam Phuntsok 
 Urgen Topgye 
 Kunchok Tenpa (2nd time of 2)
 Ngawang Gelek 
 Kelsang Dorjee Bhutia

2017 Asian Trekking ONGC Eco Everest Expedition 
The 2017 Asian Trekking ONGC Eco Everest Expedition by Oil and Natural Gas Corporation led by Satendra K. Sangwan recorded a total of 16 persons reach on the summit, 7 of them was Indians and 9 sherpas.

South Col side summiteers
 Love Raj Singh Dharmshaktu (6th time of 7)
 Yogendar Garbiyal
 Ngayaising Jagoi
 Rahul Jarngal
 Prabhat Gaurav
 Nirmal Kumar
 Santosh Kumar Singh
Another South Col side summiteers in 2017

South Col side summiteers
 Kishor Dattatraya Dhankude (2nd time of 2)
 Brij Mohan Sharma
 Ravi Kumar (Died)
 Hemant Gupta
 Kuntal Kanrar
 Mohammed Sahabuddin

2018
2018 recorded a total of 69 ascents by Indians - 8 of them women - 18 from the North Col and 51 from South Col. Ajeet Bajaj and Dia Susanna Bajaj, a father-daughter duo from Delhi, made history by conquering Mount Everest on 16 May. Sangeeta Sindhi Bahl became the oldest Indian woman to have scaled the world's tallest peak at the age of 53 years.

The second Border Security Force (BSF) Everest Expedition 2018, led by Love Raj Singh Dharmshaktu, recorded a total of 30 persons to reach the summit.

South Col side summiteers
Love Raj Singh Dharmshaktu
 Pritam Chand
 Anwar Hussain
 Aasif Jaan
 Praveen Kumar
 Parveen Singh
 Vikash Singh Rawat
 Suresh Chhetri
 Manoj Dahal
 Ravi Kant Negi
 Kamlesh Kumar
 Suneel Kumar
 Avinash Negi
 Kedar Singh
 Darshan Tamang

The 2018 Uttarakhand State Police Everest Expedition led by Sanjay Kumar Gunjyal recorded a total of 16 persons reaching the summit - 8 of them was Indians and 8 sherpas.

South Col side summiteers
 Manoj Kumar Joshi
 Vijendra Kuriyal
 Praveen Singh
 Yogesh Singh
 Suryakant Uniyal
 Ravi Chauhan
 Virendra Prasad
 Sanjay Kumar Upreti

2018 NIMAS India Everest Expedition 
The 2018 NIMAS India Everest Expedition by National Institute of Mountaineering and Allied Sports led by Colonel Sarfraz Singh recorded a total of 13 persons reach on the summit, 8 of them was Indians and 5 sherpas.

South Col side summiteers
 Sarfraz Singh Kular
 Dorjee Khandu
 Gajur Man Rai
 Hem Singh
 Pravendra Kumar
 Sanjay Kumar
 Tongchen Nimsonga
 Ram Singh Rawat

The 2018 Force Motors Everest Expedition led by Sauraj Jhingan recorded a total of 4 persons reaching the summit - 2 of them were Indians and 2 were sherpas.

South Col side summiteers
 Sauraj Jhingan
 Samir Nicholas Patham

18 other people reached the summit as part of different expeditions. They were: 
 Bhagwan Bhikoba Chawale
 Prajit Rasiklal Pardeshi
 Sangeeta Sindhi Bahl
 Tamut Taka
 Kishon Tekseng
 Amit Kumar
 Sandeep Mansukhani
 Sandeep Toliya
 Navdeep Bittu
 Swarnalata Dalai
 Manisha Jaykrishna Waghmare
 Poonam
 Rahul Gupta
 Muri Linggi
 Rohtash Khileri
 Shivangi Pathak
 Vikas Shambhu Prasad Dimri (Vikas Dimri)

The 2018 Transcend Adventurous Everest Expedition led by Shekhar Babu Bachinepally recorded a total of 40 persons reaching the summit - 18 of them were Indians and 22 were sherpas.

North Col side summiteers
 Himamsa Shaik
 Raja Kojja
 Kavidas Pandurang Katmode
 Umakant Suresh Madavi
 Pramesh Sitaram Ale
 Manisha Dharma Dhurve
 Mehul Pravinchandra Joshi
 Venkata Surya Prakash Korikala
 Ajeet Bajaj
 Deeya Suzannah Bajaj
 Asha Kiran Rani Koyyi
 Praveen Kumar Jujjavarapu
 Raju Gosala
 Borage Prasanna Kumar
 Bhanu Surya Prakash Podudolu
 Vikas Mahadeo Soyam
 Vikram Chandra Naik
 Venkatesh Maheshwari

2019
2019 recorded a total of 77 ascents by Indians - 18 of them women - from both South Col and North Col side.

South Col side summiteers
Megha Parmar
Aditya Gupta
Romil Barthwal
Bhawna Dehariya
Abdul Nassar
 Aditi Vaidya
 Anuja Vaidya
 Vivek Thakur
North Col side summiteers

 Kuntal Joisher
 Parth Upadhyay

2020 
There were no summit attempts in 2020 as Nepal and Tibet, both sides were closed during the COVID-19 pandemic.

2021 
Manish Kashniyal

2022 
Piyali Basak

See also
List of Mount Everest records of India
List of Mount Everest records
List of Mount Everest summiters by number of times to the summit 
 Sports in India – Overview of 'sports in India'.

References

Indian summiters of Mount Everest
Mount Everest
Mount Everest expeditions
Climbing and mountaineering-related lists
Indian mountain climbers
Indian female mountain climbers
Living people
Year of birth missing (living people)
Mountaineering in India